Stegenagapanthia albovittata is a species of beetle in the family Cerambycidae. It was described by Maurice Pic in 1924.

References

Lamiini
Beetles described in 1924